Stephen Owen (born October 30, 1946) is an American sinologist specializing in Chinese literature, particularly Tang dynasty poetry and comparative poetics. He taught Chinese literature and comparative literature at Harvard University and is James Bryant Conant University Professor, Emeritus; becoming emeritus before he was one of only 25 Harvard University Professors. He is a member of American Academy of Arts and Sciences and a member of American Philosophical Society.

Owen graduated from Yale University in 1968 and continued at Yale as a graduate student, receiving his doctorate in 1972 under Hans Fränkel. He taught at Yale from 1972 to 1982, when he went to Harvard. He has been a Fulbright Scholar and held a Guggenheim Fellowship, among many other awards and honors. In 2015, he completed a six-volume annotated translation of the complete poems of Du Fu.  He was jointly awarded the 2018  Tang Prize in Sinology with Yoshinobu Shiba.

Scholarly career

Owen has written or edited dozens of books, articles, and anthologies in the field of Chinese literature, especially Chinese poetry. Harvard Magazine  reported in 1998 that colleagues see Owen as "a soaring and highly imaginative free spirit," comparing him to the eighth-century Chinese calligrapher Huaisu and to the foremost Tang dynasty poet, "the unfettered, convention-defying Li Bai..."

Of The Poetry of Meng Chiao and Han Yü,  James J. Y. Liu remarked that it "represents a remarkable achievement, especially for a first book..." A reviewer in China Review International wrote "reading Stephen Owen's The Making of Early Chinese Classical Poetry shocked me, the way a seismic shift in paradigms will."

Selected publications

 The Poetry of Meng Chiao and Han Yü. New Haven: Yale University Press, 1975.   .
 The Poetry of the Early T'ang. New Haven: Yale University Press,  1977.   . 
 Revised Edition, Quirin Press 2012, .
 The Great Age of Chinese Poetry : The High T'ang. New Haven: Yale University Press,  1981. . 
 Revised Edition, Quirin Press 2013, .
 Traditional Chinese Poetry and Poetics: Omen of the World. Madison, Wis.: University of Wisconsin Press, 1985. .
 Remembrances: The Experience of the Past in Classical Chinese Literature. Cambridge, Massachusetts: Harvard University Press, 1986.  (alk. paper).
 Mi-Lou : Poetry and the Labyrinth of Desire. Cambridge, Massachusetts: Harvard University Press, Harvard Studies in Comparative Literature,  1989.    (alk. paper).
 Readings in Chinese Literary Thought. Cambridge, Massachusetts: Council on East Asian Studies Distributed by Harvard University Press, Harvard-Yenching Institute Monograph Series,  1992. .
 An Anthology of Chinese Literature: Beginnings to 1911. New York: W.W. Norton,  1st,  1996. .
 The End of the Chinese 'Middle Ages': Essays in Mid-Tang Literary Culture. Stanford: Stanford University Press, 1996.  (alk. paper)  (pbk. alk. paper).
 The Late Tang: Chinese Poetry of the Mid-Ninth Century (827-860). Cambridge, Massachusetts: Harvard University Asia Center : Distributed by Harvard University Press, Harvard East Asian Monographs, 2006..
 The Making of Early Chinese Classical Poetry. Cambridge, Massachusetts: published by the Harvard University Asia Center: Distributed by Harvard University Press, Harvard East Asian Monographs,  2006.   .
 Kang-i Sun Chang and Stephen Owen, eds. The Cambridge History of Chinese Literature Cambridge University Press, 2010.

See also
 List of Guggenheim Fellowships awarded in 1986

References

External links
 Stephen Owen's profile at Harvard
 Stephen Owen to Inaugurate "Hu Shi Liberal-Arts Lecture Series" 2010

Living people
1946 births
Yale College alumni
Harvard University faculty
Linguists from the United States
American sinologists
Literary translators
Yale Graduate School of Arts and Sciences alumni